Georg Zoch (2 September 1902 – 31 March 1944) was a German screenwriter and film director. Zoch worked on a number of Nazi propaganda films, including his screenplay for The Degenhardts (1944).

Selected filmography

Director
 The Black Forest Girl (1933)
 Love Conquers All (1934)
 Everyone Jumps At My Command (1934)
 The Accusing Song (1936)
 Desire for Africa (1939)

Screenwriter
 The Tsarevich (1933)
 Bon Voyage (1933)
 Paganini (1934)
 The Cousin from Nowhere (1934)
 Heaven on Earth (1935)
 Every Day Isn't Sunday (1935)
 Orders Are Orders (1936)
 His Best Friend (1937)
 Nanon (1938)
 The Curtain Falls (1939)
 Police Report (1939)
 Twelve Minutes After Midnight (1939)
 U-Boote westwärts (1941)
 Menschen im Sturm (1941)
 Kohlhiesel's Daughters (1943)
 A Man for My Wife (1943)
 The Degenhardts (1944)

References

Bibliography
 Bock, Hans-Michael & Bergfelder, Tim. The Concise CineGraph. Encyclopedia of German Cinema. Berghahn Books, 2009.
 Richards, Jeffrey. Visions of Yesterday. Routledge, 1973.

External links

1902 births
1944 deaths
Film people from Gdańsk
People from West Prussia
German male writers
Male screenwriters
20th-century screenwriters